Aasaram Lomate, is a Marathi-language writer. He resides in Parbhani and works as a journalist in daily Loksatta.

He was awarded with Sahitya Akademi Award in 2016 for his short story collection Aalok. Published in 2010, Alok is a collection of six stories that largely reflect rural life and people.

Rrferences

Recipients of the Sahitya Akademi Award in Marathi
People from Parbhani
Marathi-language writers
Living people
Year of birth missing (living people)